Below are the Turkey national football team all time results:

Best / Worst Results

Best

Worst

Main Results

1923–1960

1961–1980

1981–1999

2000–2009

2010–2019

2020–2029

See also
 Turkey national football team head to head
 Turkey women's national football team results

References

External links
Türk Futbolu
Turkish Football Federation
RSSSF
FIFA.com – Turkey: Fixtures and Results
World Referee
EU-Football

 
Football in Turkey